Burkan may refer to:
Al-Burkan (The Volcano), a Libyan exile dissident group in the 1980s
Burkan-e Bala, a village in South Khorasan Province, Iran
Burkan-e Pain, a village in South Khorasan Province, Iran
Nathan Burkan (1879–1936), Romanian-American lawyer
Tolly Burkan (b. 1948), New Age speaker
Volcano H-2 (also known as Burkan H-2), Yemeni ballistic missile